Huangshigang District is a district of the city of Huangshi, Hubei province, located on the western (right) bank of the Yangtze River. Edong Bridge is located in this district. In the Sixth National Population Census of the People's Republic of China, there were five subdistricts in Huangshigang.

References

County-level divisions of Hubei
Huangshi